Craig Sandison, Lord Sandison is a Scottish judge who has been a Senator of the College of Justice since 2021.

Career
Sandison graduated from the University of Aberdeen in 1989 with a Bachelor of Laws degree and then from the University of Edinburgh with a Diploma in Legal Practice. He obtained a Diploma in Forensic Medicine from the University of Glasgow. Sandison obtained a master's degree in 1991 and a PhD in 1994, both from the University of Cambridge. He trained with Scottish solicitor's firm Brodies before becoming an Advocate at the Faculty of Advocates in 1996. He became a Queen's Counsel in 2009. It was announced on 4 February 2021 that Sandison had been appointed as a Senator of the College of Justice. He was installed as a Senator of the College of Justice at a ceremony in the Court of Session on 23 February 2021, taking the judicial title of Lord Sandison.

Sandison acted for Wings Over Scotland blogger Stuart Campbell in his defamation action against former Scottish Labour leader and Member of the Scottish Parliament Kezia Dugdale over a column that she had written in newspaper. This was the first case to ever be heard by the Inner House of the Court of Session virtually and was done so in the wake of the widespread restrictions imposed in response to the COVID-19 pandemic.

References

External links
"The Hon Lord Sandison (Craig Sandison)" at the Judiciary of Scotland
"Craig Sandison QC CV"

Scottish King's Counsel
Living people
Alumni of the University of Aberdeen
Alumni of the University of Cambridge
Alumni of the University of Edinburgh
Alumni of the University of Glasgow
Year of birth missing (living people)
Members of the Faculty of Advocates
20th-century Scottish lawyers
21st-century Scottish lawyers
Senators of the College of Justice